Khadbaatar Narankhuu (born 10 April 1993) is a Mongolian judoka.

He is the gold medallist of the 2017 Judo Grand Prix The Hague in the -73 kg category.

References

External links
 

1993 births
Living people
Mongolian male judoka